Murder Between Friends is an American murder mystery television film of 1994, directed by Waris Hussein.

It is based on the true story of the murder of Janet Myers, a Louisiana woman killed in 1984 by her husband, or his best friend, or both of them.

Outline
Close friends Kerry Myers (Stephen Lang) and Bill Fontanille (Martin Kemp) have a huge fist and knife fight at the Myers house in New Orleans. After it, Janet Myers (Lisa Blount) is found dead, beaten to death with a baseball bat, having spent the evening with her husband and Fontanille. Myers’s young son is also seriously injured, and Fontanille is admitted to hospital, bleeding from a stab wound to the belly. The two men accuse each other of murder, telling different stories to the police and later in court. Detective Easby (O'Neal Compton) has some trouble with what really happened, but to begin with the police believe Myers and charge Fontanille with murder. Later,  District Attorney John Thorn (Timothy Busfield) grasps that the story is more complex and charges both men.

Locations
The movie was largely filmed on location in New Orleans, but some scenes take place at Los Angeles City Hall and at North Spring Street, Los Angeles.

Reception
Variety applauded "skilled direction" by Hussein, relaxed performances, and an unhurried pace. It also welcomed "a subtle and deceptively simple script by Philip Rosenberg".

Cast
Stephen Lang as Kerry Myers
Martin Kemp as Bill Fontanille
Lisa Blount as Janet Myers
O'Neal Compton as Detective Pud Easby
Timothy Busfield as John Thorn, District Attorney
Karen Moncrieff as Amy Morin 
Sab Shimono as Dr Lee
Nicholas Pryor as Judge Lamartine
David Lee McLain as Clerk of Court 
Alex Courtney as René Le Gallais, Defence Attorney
Stanley Anderson as Casey
Macon McCalman as Janet Myers's lawyer
Greg Almquist as Emile
Lenny Wolpe as District Attorney
Joey Zimmerman as Boy
Buster Cooper as jazz trombone
Chuck Thomas as tenor saxophone
Johnny Kirkwood as drummer

Real life events
In real life, on February 24, 1984, a ten-hour fight took place at the house of the Myers family at Harvey, Louisiana, just across the Mississippi River from New Orleans. Myers was left with a broken left arm and head injuries, Fontanille went to a local hospital with stab wounds, and Janet Myers was found beaten to death. Fontanille later admitted to having sex with Janet Myers the day before. Questioned by the police, Fontanille’s story was that Myers had killed his wife and child and planned to put the blame on him. Initially, Fontanille was charged with second degree murder, with Myers as a key witness, but at the end of the trial the jury was tied.

Later, both men were charged with the murder and with conspiracy. Myers waived his right to a trial by jury. Fontanille was acquitted on a charge of first-degree murder, and on April 5, 1990, was convicted of manslaughter and given a 21-year prison sentence, while a judge found Myers guilty as charged and gave him a life sentence.

While in the pen, Myers became the editor of The Angolite, a magazine published by the prisoners, and received an award from the National Council on Crime and Delinquency. In 2016, Governor John Bel Edwards commuted the sentence of Myers to thirty years, and he was released from the Angola Penitentiary on parole. 

The story of the murder and the men’s trials is detailed in a book by Joseph Bosco, Blood Will Tell: A True Story of Deadly Lust in New Orleans (1993).

Notes

External links

Murder Between Friends (1994) at YouTube
545 So. 2d 981 (1989) STATE of Louisiana v. Kerry MYERS and William Fontanille

1994 films
1990s American films
1990s mystery thriller films
1990s English-language films
American detective films
American mystery thriller films
Films directed by Waris Hussein
Films scored by Mark Snow
Films set in New Orleans
Films shot in New Orleans
Murder mystery films